Harutyun ( and in Western Armenian Յարութիւն) also spelled Haroutioun, Harutiun and its variants Harout, Harut and Artin is a common male Armenian name; it means "resurrection" in Armenian.

People with the name

Harutyun
 Harutyun Vardanyan (born 1970), Armenian football defender
 Harutyun Gharmandarian (1910–1967), Armenian painter
 Harutyun Karapetyan (born 1972), Armenian football (soccer) player
 Harutyun Shmavonyan (1750–1824), priest and founder of Armenian journalism
 Harutyun Sayatyan (1712–1795), Armenian musician and composer, more widely known as Sayat Nova

Haroutioun
 Haroutioun Hovanes Chakmakjian (1878–1973), Armenian American published scientist, chemistry professor and scholar

Harout
 Harout Chitilian (born 1980), Canadian city councillor from Montreal, Quebec of Lebanese Armenian origin
 Harout Pamboukjian (born 1950), Armenian American pop singer, also known as Dzakh Harut

Harut
 Harut Grigorian (born 1989), Armenian-Belgian kickboxer
 Harut Sassounian (born 1950), Armenian-American writer, public activist and publisher of The California Courier

Artin

 Artin Boşgezenyan, an Armenian deputy for Aleppo in the first (1908–1912), second (April–August 1912) and third (1914–1918) Ottoman Parliaments of the Constitutional Era
 Artin Hindoğlu, 19th-century Ottoman etymologist, interpreter, professor, linguist, and writer of the first modern French-Turkish dictionary
 Artin Penik (1921–1982), Turkish-Armenian protester who committed suicide by self-immolation

See also 
 Artin (name)
 Harut (disambiguation)
 Harutyunyan
 Surp Harutyun (disambiguation)

References 

Armenian masculine given names